Roseibium alexandrii is a bacterium from the genus of Roseibium, which has been isolated from the dinoflagellate Alexandrium lusitanicum in Germany.

References 

Rhodobacteraceae
Bacteria described in 2007